Haereiti Hetet (born 10 July 1997) is a Fijian rugby union player who plays for Bay of Plenty in the National Provincial Championship. His playing position is prop. He made his Fiji debut in 2020 against Georgia. He is the son of former Flying Fijian prop, Joeli Veitayaki.

Reference list

External links
 

1997 births
Fijian rugby union players
Fiji international rugby union players
New Zealand rugby union players
Māori All Blacks players
Living people
Rugby union props
Waikato rugby union players
Bay of Plenty rugby union players
Fijian Drua players